John Luther (c. 1739–1786) was an English politician.

Life
The son of Richard Luther of Ongar, Essex, he was educated at Newcome's School in Hackney, and Trinity College, Cambridge, where he matriculated in 1756, graduating B.A. and M.A. in 1761. He had entered the Middle Temple to study law in 1755.

He was elected a member of the Parliament of Great Britain for Essex from 13 December 1763 to 1784. A Whig, he left his wife in 1764 and went to Paris at the time when the government was pursuing John Wilkes. Richard Watson persuaded him to return and be reconciled with his wife and family.

The family lived at Great Myles house in Kelvedon Hatch, near Ongar, Essex.

Family
On 20 January 1762 Luther had obtained a licence to marry Levina Alexander Bennet, daughter of Bennet Alexander Bennet (1702–1745) and his wife Mary Ash (born 1719), who married again in 1747 to Richard Bull. Levina's brother was  Richard Henry Alexander Bennet.

His nephew Francis Fane of Spettisbury (1752–1813), was MP for Lyme Regis and Dorset and inherited Luther's Ongar estate. 

Luther left an estate at Petworth, Sussex to Bishop Watson.

References

1786 deaths
People educated at Newcome's School
Alumni of Trinity College, Cambridge
Members of the Middle Temple
Members of the Parliament of Great Britain for English constituencies
British MPs 1761–1768
British MPs 1768–1774
British MPs 1774–1780
British MPs 1780–1784
Year of birth uncertain